The 2014 Special Honours in New Zealand was a Special Honours List dated 25 March 2014, recognising the service of the outgoing Secretary of the Cabinet and Clerk of the Executive Council.

In addition, two other Special Honours Lists, published on 2 April and 8 December, promulgated the 2014 New Zealand bravery awards and the 2014 New Zealand gallantry awards.

Royal Victorian Order

Commander (CVO)
 Rebecca Lucy Kitteridge – on relinquishing the role of Secretary of the Cabinet and Clerk of the Executive Council in New Zealand.

References

Special honours
Special honours